Everyone is a Canadian comedy-drama film, written and directed by Bill Marchant and released in 2004. The film centres on a gay couple, Ryan (Matt Fentiman) and Grant (Mark Hildreth), who are having a wedding ceremony in their backyard, only to find that many of their guests have brought their own family dramas and dysfunctions.

The film premiered at the Montreal World Film Festival in 2004.

Cast
Starring
Matt Fentiman as Ryan
Mark Hildreth as Grant
Brendan Fletcher as Dylan
Other cast
(in alphabetical order)
Katherine Billings as Rebecca
Michael Chase as Gale
Suzanne Hepburn as Trish
Bill Marchant as Shepard
Cara McDowell as Rachel
Andrew Moxham as Kalvin
Stephen Park as Luke
Carly Pope as Rena
Tom Scholte as Roger
Nancy Sivak as Madeline
Debra Thorne as Betty
Anna Williams as Jenny

Awards
At the Montreal World Film Festival, the film won the Golden Zenith Prize for Best Canadian Film. At the Inside Out Film and Video Festival in 2005, it won the award for Best Canadian Film.

At the 2004 Vancouver International Film Festival, the film was one of the runners-up for the Most Popular Canadian Film award.

Hildreth and Fentiman received Leo Award nominations for Best Actor, and Fletcher received a nomination for Best Supporting Actor, in 2005.

References

External links

2004 films
Gay-related films
Canadian comedy-drama films
Canadian LGBT-related films
2004 LGBT-related films
LGBT-related comedy-drama films
English-language Canadian films
2000s English-language films
2000s Canadian films